Jūbei is a Japanese given name, which may refer to:

 Akechi Mitsuhide, Japanese daimyō who betrayed Oda Nobunaga
, Japanese samurai

Characters 
 Jimushi Juubei, a character in the novel The Kouga Ninja Scrolls and its adaptations
 Jubei Kibagami, a character in Ninja Scroll: The Series
 Satoshi Hasashi, a character in Mortal Kombat Legacy web series anthology
 Jubei, a character in the BlazBlue series
 Jubei, a Henchmen in Evil Genius (video game) and Evil Genius 2 games.
 Shigekura Jūbei, a character in Rurouni Kenshin
 Jubei Yamada, a character in the Fatal Fury video games
 Yagyu Jubei, a character from the light novel and anime Hyakka Ryōran Samurai Girls.
Jubei Yagyu, a character in the game Onimusha 2: Samurai's Destiny.

Other 
 Jubei-chan: The Ninja Girl

See also 
 Jubei Yagyu (disambiguation)

Japanese masculine given names